Archiminolia ziczac is a species of sea snail, a marine gastropod mollusk in the family Solariellidae.

Description
The size of the shell varies between 6 mm and 10 mm.

Distribution
This marine species occurs off the Philippines and Japan.

References

 Kuroda, T, Habe, T, Oyama, K, The Sea Shells of Sagami Bay, 489 pp, 121 pls., Maruzen Co. Ltd., Tokyo

External links
 To Encyclopedia of Life
 To World Register of Marine Species
 

ziczac
Gastropods described in 1971